30 The Shambles is an historic building in the English city of York, North Yorkshire. A Grade II listed building, part of the structure dates to the mid-18th century, but it was partly rebuilt around two hundred years later.

Composition 
Per Historic England, the building is composed of orange brown brick "in a random bond". It features timber-boxed eaves and a pantile roof. There is a door on its Shambles façade and via the passage to the left, which leads to Shambles Market.

The rainwater head is initialled "TC" and is dated 1763. The building's interior was not inspected.

As of 2023, the building is occupied by The Shop That Must Not Be Named.

References 

30
Houses in North Yorkshire
Buildings and structures in North Yorkshire
18th-century establishments in England
Grade II listed buildings in York
Grade II listed houses
18th century in York